"Kenneth" Lau Chi Yung (born 6 June 1960) is a Hong Kong racing driver and businessman currently competing in the TCR Asia Series and Porsche Carrera Cup Asia. Having previously competed in the Asian Touring Car Series, Clio Cup China Series and Hong Kong Touring Car Championship amongst others.

Racing career
Lau began his career in 2004 in the Asian Formula Renault Series. He raced in the series for many years, finishing 8th in the Masters standings in 2014. He has raced in the Hong Kong Touring Car Championship and the Clio Cup China Series. He finished 2nd in the Clio Cup China Series championship standings in 2010. In 2011 Lau made his Asian Touring Car Series debut, ending 2nd in the championship standings that year.

In August 2015 it was announced that he would race in the first ever TCR Asia Series round in Sepang, driving a Honda Civic TCR for Prince Racing.

Racing record

Complete TCR International Series results
(key) (Races in bold indicate pole position) (Races in italics indicate fastest lap)

References

External links
 

1960 births
Living people
Asian Formula Renault Challenge drivers
Asian Touring Car Championship drivers
TCR Asia Series drivers
TCR International Series drivers
Hong Kong racing drivers
Ferrari Challenge drivers